is a town located in Fukui Prefecture, Japan. ,  the town had an estimated population of 10,490 in 4278 households and a population density of 63 persons per km².

Geography
Takahama is located in the far southwestern corner of Fukui Prefecture, bordered by Kyoto Prefecture to the west and the heavily indented ria coast of Wakasa Bay of Sea of Japan to the north. Parts of the town are within the borders of the Wakasa Wan Quasi-National Park.

Neighbouring municipalities
Fukui Prefecture
Ōi
Kyoto Prefecture
Ayabe
Maizuru

Climate
Takahama has a Humid climate (Köppen Cfa) characterized by warm, wet summers and cold winters with heavy snowfall.  The average annual temperature in Takahama is 14.8 °C. The average annual rainfall is 1930 mm with September as the wettest month. The temperatures are highest on average in August, at around 27.3 °C, and lowest in January, at around 3.7 °C.

Demographics
Per Japanese census data, the population of Takahama has declined slightly over the past 30 years.

History
Takahama is part of ancient Wakasa Province. During the Edo period, the area was part of the holdings of Obama Domain. Following the Meiji restoration, it was organised into part of Ōi District in Fukui Prefecture. With the establishment of the modern municipalities system on April 1, 1889, the village of Takahama was established. Takahama was elevated to town status on April 1, 1912. On February 11, 1955, Takahama annexed the neighbouring villages of Aonogō, Wada and Uchiura.

Economy
The economy of Takahama, previously dependent on commercial fishing and agriculture is now very heavily dependent on the nuclear power industry. The partial closure of the Takahama Nuclear Power Plant since the 2011 Fukushima Nuclear Disaster has adversely affected the local economy.

Education
Takahama has four public elementary schools and one public middle school operated by the town government. The town does not have a high school.

Transportation

Railway
  JR West - Obama Line

Highway

International relations 
 - Boryeong, South Chungcheong, Korea, friendship city since November 3, 1990

References

External links

 

 
Towns in Fukui Prefecture
Populated coastal places in Japan